Micraglossa beia is a moth in the family Crambidae. It was described by Wei-Chun Li, Hou-Hun Li and Matthias Nuss in 2010. It is found in China (Xizang, Sichuan, Guizhou, Henan, Hubei, Fujian, Gansu, Zhejiang, Guangxi).

The length of the forewings is 6–8 mm for males and 6–8.5 mm for females. The ground colour of the forewings ranges from pale to golden, suffused with black. There are two black spots in the basal area. The subterminal and postmedian line form an X shape.

Etymology
The species name is derived from the Chinese word bei (meaning north) and refers to the northernmost known occurrence of any Micraglossa species.

References

Moths described in 2010
Scopariinae